The Aldine was a monthly arts magazine published in New York in the 1800s.

History 
The Aldine was published by Sutton Browne & Company starting in 1868 as The Aldine Press, which was shortened in 1871. Subtitles included A typographic art journal from 1871 to 1873, and The art journal of America from 1874 to 1879. Richard Henry Stoddard was the editor-in-chief from 1871 to 1875. The magazine contained high quality engravings of works by Thomas Moran and other Hudson River School painters. It also featured many reproductions of works by popular European academic artists such as Gustave Dore and William-Adolphe Bouguereau.

According to art historian Janice Simon, the "extensive accounts of what the editors deemed the nation's most picturesque and sublime regions...branded The Aldine as a formidable competitor to Appleton's Journal and its publication of 1872, Picturesque America."  Harry Fenn, prominent contributor to the many Picturesque publications, also did some work for Aldine.

The word "aldine" is defined in the Oxford English Dictionary as, first, an adjective, "Designating editions of Greek and Latin classics (including many first printed editions, or principes) issued at Venice by Aldus Manutius (Teobaldo Manucci, 1450–1515), and his family (c1490–1597). Also: designating the press which produced them, and certain fonts of printing type based on designs used there." The 2nd definition of the word, in the OED, is a noun meaning, "An Aldine book or edition; an Aldine font."

References

Further reading
 Mott, Frank Luther. A history of American magazines. vol. 3. 1865-1885 (Harvard University Press, 1938), pp 410-12.
 Simon, Janice, Consuming Pictures: The Aldine, The Art Journal of America and the Art of Self-Promotion, The American Transcendental Quarterly, Sept 1998, Vol. 12 (3) p. 221
 "Nature's Forest Volume": The Aldine, the Adirondacks, and the Sylvan Landscape, in Adirondack Prints and Printmakers: The Call of the Wild. Ed. Caroline Welsh. New York: Syracuse UP & The Adirondack Museum, 1998.

External links
 The Aldine Archives
 The Aldine 1871-1879 at JSTOR
 The Aldine at The Internet Archive

Visual arts magazines published in the United States
Monthly magazines published in the United States
Defunct literary magazines published in the United States
Magazines established in 1868
Magazines disestablished in 1879
Magazines published in New York (state)